Akhtaruzzaman may refer to:
 Akhtaruzzaman (director) (1946/1947–2011), Bangladeshi film director
 Akhtaruzzaman (politician) (fl. 1996–2001), Bangladesh politician
 Akhteruzzaman Elias (1943–1997), Bangladeshi novelist
 Md. Akhtaruzzaman (born 1963/1964), Bangladeshi academic